Maysville is an unincorporated community located within West Salem Township, Mercer County, Pennsylvania.

References

Unincorporated communities in Mercer County, Pennsylvania
Unincorporated communities in Pennsylvania